Georges Sainte-Rose (born 3 September 1969 in Fort-de-France, Martinique) is a retired French triple jumper. He formerly represented Martinique. 

His cousins Robert Sainte-Rose and Lucien Sainte-Rose have won international medals in athletics as well.

Achievements

References

1969 births
Living people
Martiniquais athletes
French male triple jumpers
Martiniquais sportsmen
Athletes (track and field) at the 1992 Summer Olympics
Olympic athletes of France
French people of Martiniquais descent
Mediterranean Games silver medalists for France
Mediterranean Games medalists in athletics
Athletes (track and field) at the 1993 Mediterranean Games